Sequeira may refer to:

Places 
 Sequeira, Braga, Portugal
 Sequeira, Uruguay

People 
Aarti Sequeira (born 1978), Indian chef and TV host
Adélia Sequeira, Portuguese mathematician
Aleixo Sequeira
Alejandro Sequeira (born 1975), Costa Rican footballer
Bárbara da Silva Sequeira (born 1996), Portuguese gymnast
Bemvindo Sequeira (born 1947), Brazilian actor
Bridget Sequeira (1905–1987), Indian Christian missionary
Christopher Sequeira, Australian filmmaker
Denzil Sequeira (born 1990), Indian-born Botswanan cricketer
Diogo Lopes de Sequeira (1465–1530), Portuguese explorer
Domingos Sequeira (1768–1837), Portuguese painter
Douglas Sequeira (born 1977), Costa Rican footballer
Edward Sequeira (born 1940), Indian athlete
Erasmo de Sequeira (born 1997), Indian politician
Germán Sequeira (1884–1951), Nicaraguan politician
Gomes de Sequeira, 16th-century Portuguese explorer
Horacio Sequeira (born 1995), Uruguayan footballer
Isaac de Sequeira Samuda (1681–1729), British physician
Isaac Henrique Sequeira (1738-1816), Portuguese physician
Jack de Sequeira (1915–1989), Indian politician
João Félix Sequeira (born 1999), Portuguese footballer
Joel Sequeira (born 1988), Indian footballer
Juanito Sequeira (born 1982), Dutch footballer
Keith Sequeira (born 1983), Indian actor
Luís Lopes de Sequeira (died 1681), Portuguese military commander
Marlon Sequeira (born 1989), Canadian soccer player
Maria de Fátima Silva de Sequeira Dias (1958–2013), Portuguese historian
Mary D'Souza Sequeira, Indian athlete
Naomi Sequeira (born 1994), Australian actress
Stephanie Sequeira (born 1993), American bodybuilder
Sequeira Costa (1929–2019), Portuguese pianist
Valdir Sequeira (born 1981), Portuguese volleyball player

Portuguese-language surnames